17th Street may refer to:

 17th Street (Atlanta), Georgia
 17th Street (Manhattan), New York
 Cropsey Avenue or West 17th Street, Brooklyn, New York
 17th Street (album), a 2011 album by Hammers of Misfortune

See also
 17th Street Bridge (Vero Beach, Florida), Indian River County, Florida
 17th Street Canal, New Orleans, Louisiana
 17th Street Plaza, Denver Colorado
 17th Street West Bridge, Huntington, West Virginia